Van Vleck High School is a public high school located in the city of Van Vleck, Texas, in Matagorda County, United States and classified as a 3A school by the UIL.  It is a part of the Van Vleck Independent School District located in northeast Matagorda County.   In 2013, the school was rated "Met Standard" by the Texas Education Agency.

Athletics
The Van Vleck Leopards compete in these sports -

Volleyball, Cross Country, Football, Basketball, Powerlifting, Golf, Tennis, Track, Baseball & Softball

State Finalist
Football
1980(3A)
Basketball
1975(2A)
2000 (2A)

Notable alumni
Charles Austin - (born December 19, 1967) is an American athlete who won the gold medal in the men's high jump at the 1996 Summer Olympics in Atlanta.

References

External links 
 

Schools in Matagorda County, Texas
Public high schools in Texas